Glipostenoda excellens is a species of beetle in the genus Glipostenoda. It was described in 1995.

References

excellens
Beetles described in 1995